Ankarapithecus is a genus of extinct ape. Its remains were found close to Ankara in central Turkey beginning in the 1950s. It lived during the Late Miocene and was similar to Sivapithecus. Ankarapithecus are different as their specimen are relatively very large than other apes especially their mandibles and palates. 

Prehistoric apes
Prehistoric primate genera
Fossil taxa described in 1996
Miocene primates of Asia
Prehistoric Anatolia
Miocene mammals of Asia
Prehistoric monotypic mammal genera